Mount Alma is a rural locality in the Gladstone Region, Queensland, Australia.

Geography 
The locality is bounded by the Mount Alma Range to the north, the Calliope Range to the west and south-west, and the Boyne Range to the south-east.

The Calliope River rises in the north-west of the locality flowing south-east towards the centre of the locality and then flows north-east to exit the locality to the east (Wooderson).

Upper Calliope is a neighbourhood within the north-east of the locality.

Mount Alma has the following mountains:

 Cedric Mountain 
 Fig Tree Hill 
 Mount Grim 
 Mount Harper 
 Mount Redshirt 
 Round Mountain 
 The Mole Hill 
The Dawson Highway enters the locality from the east (Wooderson) and exits to the south-west (Dumgree).

The Moura railway line also enters the locality from the east (Wooderson) and exits to the south-west (Dumgree) with the locality being served by:

 Clarke railway station
 Fry railway station
In the south of the locality are two protected areas:

 Maxwelton State Forest,  at 
 northern section of Kroombit Tops National Park at 
Apart from the protected areas, the predominant land use is grazing on native vegetation with a small area of production forestry in the south-west of the locality.

History 
Calliope Station Provisional School opened in March 1912  as a half time school in conjunction with Mount Redshirt Provisional School (meaning they shared a teacher). In 1917 it became a full time provisional school. On 1 August 1922 it became Calliope Station State School. It closed on 8 July 1956. It was at 44 Galloway Plains Road.

Economy 
There are a number of homesteads in the locality:

 Bocoolima
 Colenso
 Galloway Plains
 Mount Alma
 Rockfield
 Upper Calliope
 Wyalla

Education 
There are no schools in Mount Alma. The nearest government primary schools are Mount Larcom State School in Mount Larcom to the north, Calliope State School in Calliope to the east, and Mount Murchison State School in Mount Murchison to the south-west. The nearest government secondary schools are Calliope State High School (to Year 10) in Calliope to the east, Gladstone State High School (to Year 12) in South Gladstone to the north-east, and Biloela State High School (to Year 12) in Biloela to the south-west. There are some parts of Mount Alma too distant from these schools; distance education or boarding school would be other options.

References 

Gladstone Region
Localities in Queensland